This is a list of 274 species in the genus Pachyschelus.

Pachyschelus species

References